Temple Hirst Preceptory was a priory in North Yorkshire, England.

History and overview

The Knights Templar established a preceptory at Temple Hirst. Other Yorkshire preceptories included Temple Newsam, Cowton, Westerdale, Ribston Hall, Faxfleet, Foulbridge, Wetherby and Weedley.

Ralph and William Hastings gave Temple Hirst to the Templars in 1152, and the grant was confirmed, probably in 1155 by Henry de Lacy.  There appears to have been a preceptory established by 1160, when Robert Pirou was described as preceptor of Temple Hirst.

The preceptory became the administrative centre for a significant estate, as the Templars at Hirst received land grants in Norton (1160–70), Eggborough (c. 1161–77 and c. 1175–7) and the Templars’ Inquest of 1185 records lands in Kellington, Fenwick, Norton, Fairburn, Burghwallis, the church of Kellington and two mills at Hirst. During the thirteenth century, the preceptory acquired properties in Hirst Courtney, East, Chapel and West Haddlesey, Osgodby, Thorne and Fishlake, and by 1308 also held lands in Hensall, Smeaton and Burn.

An inventory of the goods at Temple Hirst in 1308 lists a hall or treasury, chapel, kitchen and larder, brewhouse, bakehouse, and dovecot, while another made in 1312 adds a dormitory, dairy, granary and forge. The chapel had an altar to the Blessed Virgin Mary. There was also a grange just across the river at Potterlawe in Eggborough, later known as Sherwood Hall. Sherwood Hall was demolished in the 1960s to construct Eggborough Power Station.

At the trial of the Templars, the archbishop’s official claimed that Sir Miles Stapleton and Sir Adam Everingham had told him that they were once invited with other knights to a banquet at Temple Hirst where they were told that many of the brethren were accustomed to worship a calf.

Later history 

The estate remained with the Darcy family until Thomas, lord Darcy, was executed in 1537 for his role in the Pilgrimage of Grace.

Templestowe
The remains of the preceptory may have provided the inspiration for the preceptory called Templestowe in Sir Walter Scott’s novel, Ivanhoe. The bell of the church of St Michael described in the novel has been identified as belonging to the Templar’s church at Kellington. Scott’s friend, Mr Morritt of Rokeby, owned Sherwood Hall, the former grange of Potterlawe held by the preceptory at Temple Hirst.

References

External sources
John S. Lee, ‘Landowners and landscapes: the Knights Templar and their successors at Temple Hirst, Yorkshire’, The Local Historian, 41 (2011), 293–307.

The Corpus of Romanesque Sculpture in Britain & Ireland, Temple Hirst, Yorkshire, West Riding 

Monasteries in North Yorkshire